Cep, also called porcino, is a common name for Boletus edulis, an edible mushroom.

Cep or CEP may also refer to:

Places
 Cep (Jindřichův Hradec District), a village in the Czech Republic

Acronyms

Organizations
 Campaign for an English Parliament, a pressure group which seeks the establishment of a devolved English parliament
 Centre for Economic Performance, a research centre at the London School of Economics
 Civic Education Project, a non-profit organization, promoting social sciences education in transition countries
 Clean Energy Partnership, a joint hydrogen project in Europe
 The Clean Energy Project, a distributed computing research project at Harvard University, seeking new materials for solar cells
 Communications, Energy and Paperworkers Union of Canada, a Canadian trade union
 Congregation for the Evangelization of Peoples, a dicastery of the Roman Curia
 Corpo Expedicionário Português (Portuguese Expeditionary Corps), a World War I military formation (1917–1918)
 Counter Extremism Project, a nonprofit NGO that combats extremist groups

Science, technology, and medicine
 Carrier-envelope phase, the phase difference of carrier and envelope of an optical pulse
Cep., A standard astronomical abbreviation referring to the Cepheus (constellation)
Circular error probable in ballistics, a measure of a weapon system's precision
 Complex event processing, an approach to processing events in software engineering
 Congenital erythropoietic porphyria, also known as Gunther disease
 British Rail Class 411, or 4 Cep, electric multiple units 
 Lactocepin, an enzyme

Other uses 
 Código de Endereçamento Postal, the Brazilian postal code system
 CEP, a musical project by American musician Caroline Polachek